Sonia Radeva (born 11 March 1985 in Sofia) is a Bulgarian former competitive figure skater. She is a three-time Bulgarian national champion and reached the free skate at two ISU Championships – the 2005 European Championships in Turin, Italy, and the 2006 European Championships in Lyon, France.

Programs

Competitive highlights
GP: Grand Prix; JGP: Junior Grand Prix

References

External links
 

Bulgarian female single skaters
1985 births
Living people
Figure skaters from Sofia